Plavna (Serbian Cyrillic: Плавна) is a village in Serbia. It is situated in the Bač municipality, in the South Bačka District, Vojvodina province. Its population is ethnically mixed and numbering 1,392 people (2002 census).

Name
In Serbian, the village is known as Plavna (Плавна), in Croatian (Šokac) as Plavna, in Hungarian as Palona, and in German as Plawingen.

Geography
It is located 150 km north of Belgrade and 75 km of Novi Sad, the capital of the province of Vojvodina, at the southwest of Bačka.

Ethnic groups (2002 census)
Its population include:
 607 (43.61%) Serbs
 312 (22.41%) Croats
 145 (10.42%) Hungarians
 112 (8.05%) Yugoslavs
 others.

According to 1991 census, population of the village included 497 Croats, 389 Serbs, 278 Yugoslavs, 196 Hungarians.

Historical population

1961: 2,662
1971: 2,033
1981: 1,712
1991: 1,538
2002: 1,392

Tourism
There is a possibility of hunting deer, doe buck, wild boar, as well as hare, pheasant, partridge and wild duck on an area of 600 hectares covered by wheat and corn.

Hunting ground Plavna – Lovačka kuća (Houting house) is located in the village of Plavna surrounded by forest. Along with usual hunting activities, it offers the possibility of  tours of the hunting ground, photo – safari, observing wild life. Restaurant can receive 100 quests.

Notable inhabitants
 Plavna is the birthplace of Antun Gustav Matoš's father who was Bunjevac.
 Josip Leko (b. 1948), Croatian politician
 József Novotny (1908–1944), chaplain, martyr of the Roman Catholic Church, a Hungarian of Czech or Slovak origin. 
 Bálint Magyar de Palona (? - 1573), Hungarian general, captain of Fonyód.

Gallery

See also
List of places in Serbia
List of cities, towns and villages in Vojvodina

References
Slobodan Ćurčić, Broj stanovnika Vojvodine, Novi Sad, 1996.

Places in Bačka
Bač, Serbia
South Bačka District
Populated places on the Danube